The Karaš (in Serbian, also Cyrillic: Караш) or Caraș (in Romanian) is a  long river in the Banat region of Vojvodina, Serbia and Romania and a left tributary of the Danube.

Name
In Roman times the river was known as Apo, from a Thracian word meaning "water". The Hungarian name is Karas.

Romania 
The Caraș originates in the Anina Mountains, northeast of the town of Anina, close to the sources of the Bârzava and Nera rivers.

Serbia 
Right after crossing the border, the Karaš receives its two major tributaries, the Borugu from the right, and the Vicinic from the left. It passes the villages of Kuštilj, Vojvodinci, Dobričevo, Straža and Jasenovo and reaches the eastern side of the Deliblatska Peščara and Dumača hill, the easternmost side of the Hills of Zagajica.  From this point, the Karaš is channeled and incorporated into the last part of the Danube-Tisa Canal. It runs alongside the villages of Dupljaja, Grebenac, Kajtasovo and Banatska Palanka before it ends its  course through Serbia, emptying into the Danube near the village of Stara Palanka, across from the tourist resort of Ram.

Settlements located near the river
In Romania: Carașova, Goruia, Ticvaniu Mare, Grădinari, Vărădia, Vrani

In Serbia: Kuštilj, Vojvodinci, Dobričevo, Straža, Jasenovo, Dupljaja, Grebenac, Kajtasovo, Banatska Palanka, Stara Palanka

Tributaries

The following are tributaries of the Karaš (from source to mouth):

Left: Buhui, Raicovacea, Șereniac, Gârliște, Goruița, Jitin, Lișava, Mercina, Ciclova, Vicinic

Right: Izvoru Mare, Jervanu Mare, Comarnic, Gelug, Dognecea, Barheș, Ciornovăț, Vărădia, Borugu

Krašovani 

Krašovani or Karašani (Cyrillic: Крашовани or Карашани; People from the Karaš), are people of South Slavic origin, settled around the town of Carașova in the river's upper course. Known as good farmers and craftsmen with an estimated number of 20,000 after World War II.

References 

 Mala Prosvetina Enciklopedija, Third edition (1985); Prosveta; 
 Jovan Đ. Marković (1990): Enciklopedijski geografski leksikon Jugoslavije; Svjetlost-Sarajevo; 

Rivers of Serbia
Rivers of Romania
Geography of Vojvodina
 
Rivers of Caraș-Severin County
Banat